6th Central Committee may refer to:
Central Committee of the 6th Congress of the Russian Social Democratic Labour Party (Bolsheviks), 1917–1918
6th Central Committee of the Bulgarian Communist Party, 1954–1958
6th Central Committee of the Chinese Communist Party, 1928–1945
6th Central Committee of the Communist Party of Cuba, 2011–2016
6th Central Committee of the Socialist Unity Party of Germany, 1963–1967
6th Central Committee of the Polish United Workers' Party, 1971–1975
6th Central Committee of the Romanian Communist Party, 1948–1955
6th Central Committee of the Lao People's Revolutionary Party, 1996–2001
6th Central Committee of the Communist Party of Vietnam, 1986–1991
6th Central Committee of the League of Communists of Yugoslavia, 1952–1958
6th Central Committee of the Hungarian Working People's Party, 1954–1959
6th Central Committee of the Workers' Party of Korea, 1980–2016